Álfrún Gunnlaugsdóttir was an Icelandic writer who was born in Reykjavík on 18 March 1938. After high school, she went to Spain and later worked on her doctoral thesis at Lausanne, Switzerland. She has written seven acclaimed novels in Iceland.

See also 

 List of Icelandic writers
 Icelandic literature

References

External links
Iceland literature site

20th-century Icelandic novelists
Gunnlaugsdottir, Alfrun
Gunnlaugsdottir, Alfrun
Icelandic women novelists
20th-century women writers